Richard Esko "Riki" Sorsa (26 December 1952 – 10 May 2016) was a Finnish pop singer. He started his career in 1974 as the lead singer in the band The Zoo. He represented Finland in the Eurovision Song Contest 1981 with the entry "Reggae OK", a reggae influenced song in Finnish which came 16th (out of 20 countries). The song was composed by Jim Pembroke, the lyrics were written by Olli Ojala, and it was conducted by Otto Donner. Sorsa released several albums, singing in Finnish, Swedish, and English. Sorsa died of cancer on 10 May 2016.

Personal life 
Sorsa's parents were Esko Sorsa, a goldsmith and entrepreneur, and Margaretha von Bahr, a ballerina. His maternal grandfather was a Swedish-speaking Finn and maternal grandmother Russian. Sorsa's brother  is a Swedish music producer.

Discography

Albums
The Zoo Hits Back (The Zoo, 1974)
Changing Tunes (1981)
Desert of Love (1982)
Riki Sorsa (1983)
This Is the Night (1983)
Kellot ja peilit (1984, CD 1985)
Myrskyn silmä (1986)
Roomanpunaista (1989)
Silmiisi sun (1992)
Riki Sorsa & Leirinuotio-orkesteri (1993)
Pieniä asioita (1994)
Suolaista ja makeaa (1996)
Valoa (2000)
Kun tunnet rakkauden – Suomalainen laulukirja (2013)

Compilations
Tähän asti – So Far 1980–1985 (1985)
CBS-klassikot (1989)
Parhaat (1998)
Haltuus annan lauluni – 18 balladia (2007)

References

External links
 Official site in Finnish

1952 births
2016 deaths
Eurovision Song Contest entrants of 1981
Eurovision Song Contest entrants for Finland
Finnish people of Russian descent
20th-century Finnish male singers
Place of birth missing
Deaths from cancer in Finland
Deaths from lung cancer